Bast-e Kheyrabad (also Romanized as Bast-e Kheyrābād) is a village in Kheyrabad Rural District, in the Central District of Kharameh County, Fars Province, Iran. At the 2006 census, its population was 319, in 85 families.

References 

Populated places in Kharameh County